Zearaja is a small genus of skates in the family Rajidae.  It currently consists of four described species found in oceans off New Zealand, Tasmania and southern South America.

Species
There are four species in the genus:

 Zearaja argentinensis (Díaz de Astarloa, Mabragaña, Hanner & Figueroa, 2008) (Argentine skate)
 Zearaja chilensis (Guichenot, 1848) (Yellownose skate)
 Zearaja maugeana Last & Gledhill, 2007 (Maugean skate)
 Zearaja nasuta (J. P. Müller & Henle, 1841) (New Zealand rough skate)

References

 
Rajidae
Ray genera
Taxa named by Gilbert Percy Whitley